Think About It! is a 1991 album by recording artist Kate Ceberano. It is her first pop album after her highly successful 1989 album Brave. The album spawned three singles; with "See Right Through" / "Everything Will Be Alright" being the most successful, peaking at number 33 in Australia in December 1991.

Critical reception
On 14 November 1991, Shane Danielsen of The Sydney Morning Herald said the album is "bright, slickly produced and essentially appealing, but hardly likely to inspire any revolutions".

Track listing
The album was released on CD, Cassette and vinyl LP.

Charts
On the Australian albums chart, Think About It! debuted at No. 24 on 13 October 1991.

References

1991 albums
Kate Ceberano albums
Mushroom Records albums
Pop albums by Australian artists